This is a list of the Members of Parliament appointed as Steward of the Manor of Old Shoreham, a notional 'office of profit under the crown' which was formerly used to resign from the House of Commons. The last steward died in 1832.

References

See also
 List of Stewards of the Chiltern Hundreds
 List of Stewards of the Manor of East Hendred
 List of Stewards of the Manor of Hempholme
 List of Stewards of the Manor of Northstead
 List of Stewards of the Manor of Poynings

Old Shoreham